NUC University, (formerly known as National University College) is the largest for-profit private university in Puerto Rico with its main campus in Bayamón, Puerto Rico. The university was founded in 1982 as the National College, and offers undergraduate studies and graduate studies in health, business administration, education, information technology, and criminal justice. 

NUC University is accredited by the Council of Higher Education of Puerto Rico and the Middle States Commission on Higher Education.

History 

In 1980, a steering committee, led by Jesús Siverio Orta, worked on the planning and organization of the institution. It was not until the first of April, 1982 that the institution began its educational operations in Bayamón, Puerto Rico under the name National College of Business and Technology. In June of the same year, the committee acquired the Polytechnical Community College, obtaining at the same time its operating license from the Puerto Rico Department of Education with the same rights, privileges and obligations as the predecessor institution.

NUC University began its educational program with four classrooms on the third floor of the Ramos Building located in the city of Bayamón, which also had a typing laboratory, a pharmacy laboratory and a library. Initially, the institution only offered Pharmacy Assistant and Secretarial Science programs. The first group of students from these two programs graduated in July 1983.

In 1984 it opened the Arecibo Campus in Arecibo, Puerto Rico, and in 2003 the Río Grande Campus in Río Grande, Puerto Rico.
In the following years NUC University started expanding rapidly, establishing a learning center at the San Cristóbal Hospital on September of 2007 in Ponce, Puerto Rico which later became the Ponce Campus on July 10, 2009. In January 2011, NUC opened an additional location in Caguas, Puerto Rico and in June 2014, it became the Caguas Campus.

In March 2017, NUC opened a Campus in Mayagüez, Puerto Rico, and in November 2018, the institution opened it most recent campus, the South Florida Campus in the State of Florida.

Campuses 
The multi-campus school is one of the largest secondary education institutions in Puerto Rico. Today NUC University have 15 campuses, nine of them in the State of Florida, and 13 centers of the IBC technical division.

Puerto Rico Campuses:
 NUC Arecibo
 NUC Bayamón
 NUC Caguas
 NUC Mayagüez
 NUC Ponce
 NUC Río Grande

Florida Campuses:
 NUC South Florida
 NUC-FTC Deland
 NUC-FTC Kissimmee
 NUC-FTC Orlando
 NUC-FTC Pembroke Pines
 NUC-FTC South Miami
 NUC-FTC Lakeland
 NUC-FTC Tampa
 The DAVE School

Accreditations 
NUC University is authorized by the Council of Higher Education of Puerto Rico and accredited by the Middle States Commission on Higher Education to offer university studies of the undergraduate, graduate and professional levels, as the case may be. Likewise, the university is committed to the professional accreditation of its academic programs. For this reason, some academic units have programs accredited by organizations, such as:
 Accreditation Commission for Education in Nursing (ACEN)
 Commission on Accreditation in Physical Therapy Education (CAPTE)
 Council for the Accreditation of Educator Preparation (CAEP)
 American Culinary Federation Education Foundation Accrediting Commission (ACFEFAC)

Certifications and authorizations 
The institution is also authorized and certified by the following entities:
 Puerto Rico State Approving Agency for Veterans Education
 Microsoft IT Program
 U.S. Department of Education
 Vocational Rehabilitation

Memberships 
 Puerto Rico Private Education Association
 Association of Student Financial Aid Administrators of Puerto Rico
 American Association of Collegiate Registrars and Admissions Officers
 Association of Private Sector Colleges and Universities
 National Association of Student Financial Aid Administrators

References

External links 
 

Universities and colleges in Puerto Rico
Educational institutions established in 1983
1983 establishments in Puerto Rico